Obra Dam railway station is a small railway station in Sonbhadra district, Uttar Pradesh. Its code is OBR. It serves Obra town. The station consists of two platforms. The platforms are not well sheltered. It lacks many facilities including water and sanitation.

References 

Dhanbad railway division
Railway stations in Sonbhadra district